Antonio Elenetti (died 14 June 1767) was an Italian painter of the late-Baroque period, active in Verona. He trained with Simone Brentana in Verona. He painted an altarpiece of St. Anthony of Padua for the church of Ogni Santi in Verona.

Sources

1767 deaths
18th-century Italian painters
Italian male painters
Painters from Verona
Italian Baroque painters
Year of birth unknown
18th-century Italian male artists